is a train station in the city of Komoro, Nagano, Japan, operated by East Japan Railway Company (JR East).

Lines
Mitsuoka Station is served by the Koumi Line and is 75.3 kilometers from the terminus of the line at Kobuchizawa Station.

Station layout
The station consists of two opposed ground-level side platforms serving two tracks, connected by a level crossing.  The station is unattended.

Platforms

History
Mitsuoka Station opened on 14 April 1925.  With the privatization of Japanese National Railways (JNR) on 1 April 1987, the station came under the control of JR East. The current station building was completed in 2002.

Surrounding area

See also
 List of railway stations in Japan

References

External links

 JR East station information 

Railway stations in Nagano Prefecture
Railway stations in Japan opened in 1925
Stations of East Japan Railway Company
Koumi Line
Komoro, Nagano